Stonewall Mountain is a summit in the U.S. state of Nevada.

Stonewall Mountain was named after Stonewall Jackson (1824–1863), American Civil War Confederate general.

References

Mountains of Nye County, Nevada